Sinomphisa jeannelalis is a moth in the family Crambidae. It is found in Madagascar and on the Seychelles, where it has been recorded from Mahé.

References

Moths described in 1956
Spilomelinae